When the Storm Comes Down is the third studio album by thrash metal band Flotsam and Jetsam, released in 1990. It was the last album with Troy Gregory on bass guitar, as he left the band in 1991 to join Prong. It was also the first Flotsam and Jetsam album released on MCA Records, and the first one not to include songwriting contributions by former bassist Jason Newsted, who at the time was in Metallica and co-wrote the band's first two albums.

When the Storm Comes Down saw Flotsam and Jetsam take a different direction, musically and lyrically, from their previous two albums and is the band's only record to be produced by Alex Perialas. The lyrical content of this album deals with elements of political and social commentary, mirroring much of the evil and occult-related lyrics of the band's first two albums, Doomsday for the Deceiver and No Place for Disgrace. The album also saw the band starting to move towards a progressive-oriented sound, and its production value has been compared to that of Testament's Practice What You Preach, which was also produced by Perialas and released just before the recording sessions of When the Storm Comes Down started.

It was re-released on June 10, 2008, by Metal Mind Productions. This release is remastered with a bonus track and limited to 2000 copies. The re-release also contains new packaging and liner notes from the band members Eric A.K. and Ed Carlson.

Track listing

Credits

Band
Eric A.K. - vocals
Edward Carlson - guitars, backing vocals
Michael Gilbert - guitars, backing vocals
Troy Gregory - bass, backing vocals
Kelly David-Smith - drums, backing vocals

Production
Alex Perialas, Michael Rosen - producers, recording, engineering, mixing at Fantasy Studios, Berkeley
Michael Semanicki, Rob "Wacko" Hunter, Tony Volante - engineering, recording
Teresa Ensenat - A&R, direction
Andy Somers - management 
Janie Hoffman - management
T. Step - artwork (logo)
Kosh/Dakos - artwork
mastered at The Hit Factory, New York City

References

When the Storm Come Down

Flotsam and Jetsam (band) albums
1990 albums
Albums produced by Alex Perialas